Wad Madani or Madani is the capital of the Al Jazirah state in east-central Sudan. Wad Madani lies on the west bank of the Blue Nile, nearly 85 miles (136 km) southeast of Khartoum. It is linked by rail to Khartoum and is the center of a cotton-growing region. The city is also the center of local trade in wheat, peanuts, barley, and livestock. It is also headquarters of the Irrigation Service. In 2008, its population was 345,290. It is the home of the Al Jazirah University, the second biggest public university in Sudan. Further, there is Wad Medani Ahlia University, a private university.

History 
In the early 19th century, a district governor of Wad Madani (Madani) was  Daf ʿAllah Muhammad, who was married to the Funj noblewoman Nasra bint ʿAdlan; they built a palace close to Madani, with a village called Suriba. It became a small Turko-Egyptian outpost, which grew rapidly following the 1925 Gezira Scheme of irrigation to stimulate local economic development. Wad Madani is a commercial centre of the Gezira agricultural district and is mostly residential. Wad Madani has lively commercial activities with well-stocked souqs.

The river banks of Wad Madani lie East the Blue Nile, which flows into Sudan from Ethiopia. The city's facilities are more modern than most places in Sudan, except in the Khartoum area.

Famous people from Wad Madani include the popular Sudanese singers Insaf Madani, Abdel Aziz El Mubarak, Mohammed Al Ameen and Ibrahim Al Kashif. Further, the renowned human rights lawyer and President of the Sudan Human Rights Monitor, Dr. Amin Mekki Medani, and the Chairman of the National Consensus Forces, Farouk Abu Issa. The center of the town is made up of the souq, Al Daraga, Al Gism Al Awal, Wad Azrag and the Sudanese District (formerly known as the British District).

Geography

Climate

Education 
Wad Madani provides for a range of educational institutions on four levels of education. Starting from kindergarten and day-care centres, on to primary or elementary schools, and until secondary schools. For higher education, there are two universities, the University of Gezira and Wad Medani Ahlia University.

Cultural life 
In an article about the rise and decline of cinema in the city of Wad Madani, the popularity of "going to the movies" was explained in terms of its importance for public cultural life, providing a "fresh breath of freedom in light of the country’s independence." For many urban dwellers, movie shows were the only public forms of entertainment at the time. This applied both to educated and less educated people, as well as to women and girls, who were admitted as families in the company of their male relatives.

In a provincial town like Wad Madani, film shows started in the early 1950s in the form of mobile cinemas. This type of film show was presented in different neighbourhoods by the Ministry of Information by means of automobiles that could provide for a screen and a projector, managed by a specialised projectionist. Later, dedicated outdoor cinemas were built for regular shows, and in the 1970s, there were six such cinemas in Wad Madani. The films included Arab, Indian and other foreign films, for example "Guess who’s Coming to Dinner" or "War and Peace" and chosen by the 'Sudanese Cinema Institution' under the Ministry of Information. Also, international news broadcasts, for example by the BBC, were included. Censorship was exercised by special committees in order to protect social cultural values, but still with respect to the plot and artistic character of the films. Such evenings spent at the cinema "sparked heated discussions about the films being screened that carried on long after the film ended, in social occasions that brought communities together."

Starting in the 1970s, the spread of television and, more importantly, new taxes and restrictive laws, introduced in September 1983 by the Islamist government under Jaafar Nimeiry and followed by stricter censorship, led to the decline of cinemas that became gradually abandoned and derelict. Frequent cinema goers turned away from the films that could still be shown, as these performances no longer provided "a space for their rebellion against issues afflicting internal and external societies such as racism, injustice and politics."

Notable people
Nasra bint ʿAdlan, noblewoman
Amin Mekki Medani, human rights lawyer
Alexander Siddig, British actor of Sudanese origin
Abdel Aziz El Mubarak, singer and band leader
Ibrahim Al Kashif, singer-songwriter

See also
List of cities in Sudan
List of schools in Sudan

References

External links

 Wad Madani official website

Populated places in Al Jazirah (state)